Elizabeth Henrietta Torlesse (1835 – 22 September 1922) was a notable New Zealand homemaker and community leader.

She was born in County Wicklow, Ireland in about 1835 as Elizabeth Henrietta Revell. The Revell family came to New Zealand on the Minerva in 1853. She married Henry Torlesse, who was also a passenger on the Minerva. Henry Torlesse farmed with his brother Charles Torlesse, who had first come to New Zealand in the early 1840s.

References

People from County Wicklow
1922 deaths
Irish emigrants to New Zealand (before 1923)
19th-century Irish people
1835 births
19th-century New Zealand people
Wakefield family